Moon Ye-won is a South Korean actress and model. She is known for her roles in dramas such as Children of Nobody, Legal High and she is also known for her role in movies such as Gonjiam: Haunted Asylum.

Filmography

Television series

Film

References

External links 
 
 
 

1991 births
Living people
21st-century South Korean actresses
South Korean female models
South Korean television actresses
South Korean film actresses